Langhorne Library is a historic library building located at Langhorne, Bucks County, Pennsylvania.  It was built in 1888, and is a cruciform-shaped, 1 3/4-story, brick structure in a Victorian-Romanesque Revival style.  It has a steep, slate covered hipped roof, a narrow cross-gable over the entrance, and smaller gables.  The building features pilasters with terra cotta capitals and terra cotta decorative panels.  It housed the public library until the 1970s, after which it became home to the Historic Langhorne Association.  It continues to house a local history reference library and museum.

It was added to the National Register of Historic Places in 1986.  It is located in the Langhorne Historic District, listed in 1987.

References

External links

 Historic Langhorne Association website: Historic Langhorne Library

Library buildings completed in 1888
History museums in Pennsylvania
Libraries on the National Register of Historic Places in Pennsylvania
Romanesque Revival architecture in Pennsylvania
Buildings and structures in Bucks County, Pennsylvania
Museums in Bucks County, Pennsylvania
National Register of Historic Places in Bucks County, Pennsylvania
Individually listed contributing properties to historic districts on the National Register in Pennsylvania